Ruthzee Louijeune (born 1987) is an American politician and lawyer serving as at-large member of the Boston City Council. She was elected in 2021, and took office in January 2022. She is the first Haitian-American to serve on the council.

Early life and education
Louijeuene is the daughter of immigrants to the United States from Haiti. 

Louijeune was born in 1987 in Boston. was raised in the Hyde Park and Mattapan neighborhoods. She attended Charles H. Taylor Elementary School, and graduated from Boston Latin School in 2004. During high school, she interned in the office of State Representative Marie St. Fleur as part of the Ward Fellowship Program.

Louijeuene moved to New York City in order to attended Columbia University, where she graduated with a bachelor's degree in 2008. After earning her undergraduate degree, she moved to Cambridge, Massachusetts, where she attended Harvard Kennedy School and Harvard Law School, earning a master's degree in public policy and a Juris Doctor in 2014. At Harvard Law School, she was a student attorney at the Harvard Legal Aid Bureau.

Legal career
Louijeuene worked as an attorney for Perkins Coie..

Louijeuene has her own legal firm, through which she conducts consulting and works on affordable homeownership agreements in Boston.

Louijeune served as senior counsel the Elizabeth Warren's 2020 presidential campaign.

Louijeune has been involved as a volunteer with the Massachusetts Affordable Housing Alliance, representing low-income individuals in the housing court. In her work with them, she has fought against eviction and to promote homeownership. She has worked with them in their efforts to increase homeownership opprountities in Boston for first-generation home buyers. She is considered to be a housing advocate.

Boston City Council
Louijeune was elected to Boston City Council in November 2021. As a first-time candidate Louijeune had a strong showing in the 2021 election, finishing third behind incumbent council members Michael F. Flaherty and Julia Mejia. She is the first Haitian-American to serve on the council. She took office in January 2022.

In late-2022, Louijeune proposed have been an amendment to have the city regulate beekeeping. In late-2022, Louijeune played a key role in the passage of a 20% pay increase for members of the Boston Council, which was vetoed by Mayor Michelle Wu. Wu supported an 11% increase, which had been the recommendation of Boston’s compensation advisory board, but opposed a 20% increase.

Personal life
Louijeuen lives in Boston's Hyde Park neighborhood.

Electoral history

References

Boston City Council members
Massachusetts Democrats
Year of birth missing
Boston Latin School alumni
Columbia University alumni
Harvard Kennedy School alumni
Harvard Law School alumni
African-American city council members in Massachusetts
African-American women in politics
American politicians of Haitian descent
21st-century American politicians
21st-century American women politicians